Tahoon is a  village very development committee in Palpa District in the Lumbini Zone of southern Nepal. At the time of the 1991 Nepal census it had a population of 3776.

Tahoon Village is 32 km east from the district headquarters Tansen and is linked by a 24' Black Top road motorable road which diverts from Aryabhanjyang in the Siddhartha Highway. The total distance to place from Aryabhanjyang is about 14 km.

Tahoon is an attractive place having natural surroundings of mountains, forests and farmlands. One can view the panoramic beauty of Dhaulagiri, Annapurna and Machhapuchhare Mountains from this VDC. Hatti Lekh, Rambha forest, Bakumgadhi, Rimigha lekh, and Purba khola valley are other natural attractions within and around this VDC. Among the cultural attractions, Rambha Devi and Jalpa Devi temples hold the overriding position. Usually on full-moon days and other festivals a large crowd gather here to worship from different places.

Transport
Buses and jeeps are the dominant form of transportation.  Private operators offer service to various destinations. Many people are using motorcycles as private means of transport. There are direct bus services to Tansen, Butwal, Kathmandu and Rampur.

Education
Tahu is center of education for nearby village areas. There is a campus affiliated to Tribhuwan University.
Rambha Multiple Campus, Rambha-5
Rambha Higher Secondary School, Rambha-5
Rambha Devi English Boarding School, Rambha-5 (Deurali)
shree pasupati pravi school (dhobadi)              
 shree janta pravi school (thak khola)

Agriculture

Agriculture is the main occupation in the local economy. Most of the farmers have been subsistence farmers but lately many are also engaged in producing cash-crops which is sold in the Local markets.

Paddy, wheat, maize, millet and legumes are the principal crops of the region. The production of rice and
wheat crops in the same year is the predominant cropping pattern in the area.

The more fertile irrigated fields for those crops are at  valley bottoms and foothills whereas the non irrigated terraces are at higher altitude. Ginger grown in the terraced land is the one of main cash crop. The other produces are oranges and green vegetables. In the recent years many farmers have also started  coffee production.
Coffee is  being cultivated between 700 m to 1300 m above sea level in fertile, loam to infertile gravel mixed soil in this parts of Rambha Gaupalika.

Banks
Global IME Bank Limited
Muktinath Bikas Bank Limited
Many Finance Company केन्द्रीय वित्त लिमिटेड

Places of interest
Tahoon bazaar
Rambha Devi Temple
Dhobadi
Jalpa Devi Temple
Nachan Danda
Bakumgadhi

Gallery

References

Populated places in Palpa District